Pseudosimnia vanhyningi is a species of sea snail, a marine gastropod mollusk in the family Ovulidae, the ovulids, cowry allies or false cowries.

Distribution

Description 
The maximum recorded shell length is 15.4 mm.

Habitat 
Minimum recorded depth is 46 m. Maximum recorded depth is 183 m.

References

Ovulidae
Gastropods described in 1940